Sergei Grigorievich Khusainov (birth Rashid Rahmatullovich Khusainov  (born July 18, 1954, Moscow) is a Russian football referee and a former football player. He works in the international category.

Career 
After a dispute with a match referee, Khusainov decided to become a judge. In the top league of the USSR championship he refereed 74 matches. In the championship of Russia, he judged some 183 matches. He was Chief Justice of the Russian Cup final 1993. He was voted best referee in 1987, 1988, 1991–1994 and 1996–1998. In 1999, he retired.

In 1994, he coached the youth team of Russia.

References

External links
 Провокация
 Другой Хусаинов

1954 births
Living people
Soviet football referees
Russian football referees
Soviet footballers
Communist Party of the Soviet Union members
Tatar people of Russia
Russian football managers
Association football defenders